AWCC may refer to:

 AWCC, or Afghan Wireless Communication Company
 Alaska Wildlife Conservation Center, in the US
 AWCC, or Allied Wireless Communications Corporation
 AWCC, the Albury Wodonga Cycling Club, organiser of the John Woodman Memorial bicycle handicap race in New South Wales
 Association of Waterways Cruising Clubs
 AWCC, or Africa West Coast Cable, former name of the West Africa Cable System

See also 
 AWCCI, Australian Women Chamber of Commerce & Industry